The 2015 NBA Summer League consisted of three pro basketball leagues organized by the NBA: the Orlando Pro Summer League, Utah Jazz Summer League, and Las Vegas Summer League.

Ten teams participated in the week-long Orlando Pro Summer League at Amway Center in Orlando, Florida, from July 4 to 10, 2015. The Memphis Grizzlies won the Orlando Pro Summer League Championship over the Orlando Magic White team, 75–73, on a buzzer-beater floater by Russ Smith in double overtime. Aaron Gordon of the Orlando Magic was named the league's Most Valuable Player. The Miami Heat and Brooklyn Nets also participated in the Las Vegas Summer League.

The Utah Jazz Summer League was introduced for the first time in 2015, marking the first summer league to be played in Utah since the Rocky Mountain Revue was last held in 2008. Four teams participated in a round-robin format from July 6 to 9, 2015. No tournament was held, nor was there a champion named, but the Utah Jazz had the best record of the four teams, as they went undefeated with a 3–0 record. All four teams (Utah Jazz, Boston Celtics, Philadelphia 76ers, and San Antonio Spurs) also participated in the Las Vegas Summer League.

The Las Vegas NBA Summer League is the official summer league of the NBA. It is the premier summer league of the three, with a total of 23 teams, plus a Select Team from the NBA Development League, participating. A total of 67 games were played from July 10 to 20, 2015, across two different venues, the Thomas & Mack Center and Cox Pavilion, both located in Paradise, Nevada (near Las Vegas). The San Antonio Spurs won the Championship by defeating the Phoenix Suns in the championship game, 93–90. Kyle Anderson was named the league's Most Valuable Player, with Jonathon Simmons of the Spurs being named the Championship Game MVP. The Spurs championship was historic, as they were coached by Becky Hammon, the first full-time female assistant coach in the NBA.

Orlando Pro Summer League
Each team played five games. Points were awarded to teams to determine the final standings. According to NBA.com the point system works like this: each game consists of eight possible points; four points for winning the game and one point for winning a quarter (in the event of a tied quarter, each team will receive 0.5 points). In the event of ties in seeding heading into championship day, three tiebreakers will be in place: 1) total point differential; 2) total points allowed; 3) coin flip.

Teams

Orlando Magic Blue (host)
Orlando Magic White (host)
Brooklyn Nets
Charlotte Hornets
Detroit Pistons
Indiana Pacers
Los Angeles Clippers
Memphis Grizzlies
Miami Heat
Oklahoma City Thunder

Schedule
All times are in Eastern Daylight Time (UTC−4)

Day 1

Day 2

Day 3

Day 4

Day 5

Day 6

Championship day
Each team played one game on the league's final day for either first, third, fifth, seventh or ninth place.

Seeding criteria
The seeding was determined by a team's total points after the first five days. Eight points were awarded in each game: four points for winning a game and one point for every quarter a team won. In the event of a tied quarter, each team is awarded half a point. If two or more teams had equal points, then the following tiebreakers applied:
Total point differential
Least total points allowed
Coin flip
Each odd-numbered seed was paired with the team seeded immediately below it. For example, the top two seeds played in the championship game, the third and fourth seeds played in the third-place game, etc.

Standings/seedings

Championship Day Schedule
All times are in Eastern Daylight Time (UTC−4)

9th-Place Game

7th-Place Game

5th-Place Game

3rd Place Game

Final

Final standings

Individual statistical leaders
Reference:

Points

Rebounds

Assists

Honors
Josh Cohen of the Orlando Magic's website ranked the top five most valuable players in the Orlando Pro Summer League:
 Aaron Gordon, Orlando Magic (MVP)
 Stanley Johnson, Detroit Pistons
 Russ Smith, Memphis Grizzlies
 Myles Turner, Indiana Pacers
 Justise Winslow, Miami Heat

Utah Jazz Summer League
The Utah Jazz Summer League consisted of six games. Each team played three games and each team played on each day (July 6, 7, and 9).

Teams

Utah Jazz (host)
Philadelphia 76ers
San Antonio Spurs
Boston Celtics

Schedule
All times are in Eastern Daylight Time (UTC−4)

Day 1

Day 2

Day 3

Final Results

Individual statistical leaders
Reference:

Points

Rebounds

Assists

Las Vegas Summer League
A total of 67 games will be played between 24 teams. The league consists of a preliminary round (July 10–14) and an elimination tournament (July 15–16 and July 18–20). Teams will be seeded after the preliminary round for the elimination tournament.

Teams

 Atlanta Hawks
 Boston Celtics
 Brooklyn Nets
 Chicago Bulls
 Cleveland Cavaliers
 Dallas Mavericks
 Denver Nuggets
 Golden State Warriors
 Houston Rockets
 Los Angeles Lakers
 Miami Heat
 Milwaukee Bucks
 Minnesota Timberwolves
 NBA D-League Select
 New Orleans Pelicans
 New York Knicks
 Philadelphia 76ers
 Phoenix Suns
 Portland Trail Blazers
 Sacramento Kings
 San Antonio Spurs
 Toronto Raptors
 Utah Jazz
 Washington Wizards

Schedule

All times are in Eastern Daylight Time (UTC−4)

Day 1 (July 10)

Day 2 (July 11)

Day 3 (July 12)

Day 4 (July 13)

Day 5 (July 14)

Championship
The championship is determined by a single-elimination tournament; the top 8 teams receive a first-round bye.

Seeding criteria
Reference:

Teams are seeded first by overall record, then by a tiebreaker system
Head-to-head result (applicable only to ties between two teams, not to multiple-team ties)
Quarter point system (1 point for win, .5 for tie, 0 for loss, 0 for overtime periods)
Point differential
Coin flip

The head-to-head result is extremely unlikely to apply in determining seeding, since the teams play only three games before being seeded. It is impossible for two teams to both be 3-0 or 0-3 and have played one another. It is also very unlikely that exactly two teams and no others finish either 2-1 or 1-2 and for those two teams to have played one another. Even in the situation where there is a multiple-team tie and some but not all the teams have superior or inferior quarter points, the remaining teams look first to the point differential even if only two teams remain. Unlike tiebreak criteria often found in sports leagues, multiple-team ties that are reduced to two teams by progression through the tiebreaker steps are not returned to the first step of the two-team tiebreaker.

First-round losers played consolation games to determine 17th through 24th places based on the tiebreaker system stated above. Second-round losers played consolation games to determine ninth through 16th places.

Standings/seedings

Tournament Bracket

Tournament schedule

All times are in Eastern Daylight Time (UTC−4)

First round (July 15)

Second Round (July 16)

Consolation round (July 17)

Quarterfinals (July 18)

Semifinals (July 19)

Final (July 20)

Final standings

Individual statistical leaders
Reference:

Points

Rebounds

Assists

Honors
The All-Summer League First and Second Teams were selected by a panel of media members in attendance at the Las Vegas NBA Summer League.

All-NBA Summer League First Team
Kyle Anderson, San Antonio Spurs (MVP)
Seth Curry, New Orleans Pelicans
Doug McDermott, Chicago Bulls
Norman Powell, Toronto Raptors
T. J. Warren, Phoenix Suns

All-NBA Summer League Second Team
Emmanuel Mudiay, Denver Nuggets
Larry Drew II, New Orleans Pelicans
Noah Vonleh, Portland Trail Blazers
Dwight Powell, Dallas Mavericks
Alan Williams, Houston Rockets

Championship Game MVP: Jonathon Simmons, San Antonio Spurs

Summer League Rosters

Atlanta Hawks

Boston Celtics

Brooklyn Nets

Charlotte Hornets

Chicago Bulls

Cleveland Cavaliers

Dallas Mavericks

Denver Nuggets

Detroit Pistons

Golden State Warriors

Houston Rockets

Indiana Pacers

Los Angeles Clippers

Los Angeles Lakers

Memphis Grizzlies

Miami Heat

Milwaukee Bucks

Minnesota Timberwolves

New Orleans Pelicans

New York Knicks

Oklahoma City Thunder

Orlando Blue

Orlando White

Philadelphia 76ers

Phoenix Suns

Portland Trail Blazers

Sacramento Kings

San Antonio Spurs

Toronto Raptors

Utah Jazz

Washington Wizards

References

External links
Official site

2015
2015–16 NBA season
2015–16 in American basketball by league
2015 in sports in Nevada
2015 in sports in Utah
July 2015 sports events in the United States